Périers  is a commune in the Manche department in Normandy in north-western France.

History
Périers was liberated by the 2nd Battalion, 359th Infantry Regiment, 90th Division, of the United States Army, on 27 July 1944.

Heraldry

See also
Communes of the Manche department

References

Communes of Manche